The Lower Silesian District, also designated as the 2nd District, was a district that acted as an provisional administrative division of Poland, during the administration of the Provisional Government of the Republic of Poland in 1945, and the Provisional Government of National Unity from 1945 to 1946. It was centered around the area of the Lower Silesia. It was established as one of four provisional districts on 14 March 1945. On 25 September 1945, the territories near its northern border were incorporated into the Poznań Voivodeship. It existed until 28 June 1946, when it was abolished and replaced with the Wrocław Voivodeship. The head of the district was the attorney-in-fact Stanisław Piaskowski.

Gallery

Notes

References 

History of Silesia
Lower Silesia
Lower Silesia
1945 establishments in Poland
1946 disestablishments in Poland
Lower Silesia